Honeycomb housing is an urban planning model pertaining to residential subdivision design.

The defining hexagonal tessellation, or "honeycomb" pattern, consists of multiple housing clusters containing 5-16 houses and centered around a courtyard in a cul-de-sac arrangement at its smallest unit of organization. Multiple clusters are connected to each other to form larger cul-de-sac communities with up to 42 houses in total. These courtyard communities are in turn also connected to one another, making up a distinct neighborhood of up to 300 houses.

The honeycomb concept was first introduced in Malaysia as an alternative to terrace houses and the predominantly rectilinear form of residential layouts.

It can also be described as a new form of cul-de-sac layout.

From Cul-de-sac to Honeycomb

Cul-de-sacs are popular: they are perceived as being safer, more exclusive and neighbourly. According to one study, between the ‘grid’, ‘loops’ and cul-de-sacs, the latter were the most popular. However, in developing countries like Malaysia, only the very rich can afford to live in quarter-acre single-family houses located in a cul-de-sac. The Honeycomb concept was a response to two questions:

•	How can the cul-de-sac be made affordable for more people and for the environment?

•	Is it possible to have cul-de-sacs without sprawl?

First, the cul-de-sac is made bigger so as to fit in a public green area in the middle in order to meet local planning regulations that require 10% of any residential development to be open space. Then an interlocking arrangement of cul-de-sacs is created such that each building lot would face two or three cul-de-sacs. If the buildings in this layout were detached houses, they would be priced in the top range of the market. But instead, the buildings are divided into 2, 3, 4 or 6, creating duplex, triplex, quadruplex or sextuplex units.

As the buildings are divided, the land area and the built-up area become smaller; the number of units in the layout and the density of the development go up to rival that obtained in terrace house developments. In this way, the housing units become less expensive. Yet each house still retains a public access. The size and shape of the external environment are not changed – only now more units share it.

Since houses are built around a small park with plentiful shady trees, this communal garden is easily accessible to all in the cul-de-sac, allowing it to act as a social focus that can encourage social interaction and neighborly spirit.

The courtyard area is a "defensible space" as well, as it acts naturally to reduce crime in the sense that strangers are quickly spotted. The short winding roads put a stop to speeding traffic, and certain to dissuade snatch thieves on motorcycles - therefore becoming safe for children, pedestrians and cyclists.

Apart from the social advantages, it is also claimed that compared to the terrace house layout, the honeycomb layout uses land efficiently and offers savings in the cost of infrastructure.

The honeycomb Layout may be said to be inspired from the geometrical design of Islamic tiles and the structure of beehives. Introduced by Kuala Lumpur-based architect Mazlin Ghazali, it has received a patent in Australia

Honeycomb Housing projects under construction
The honeycomb concept has been applied to a hillside development on 14 acres of land at Kampung Nong Chik the edge of Johor Bahru business district in a development which advertises a modern version of the traditional village or "kampong" lifestyle.

Criticism
Being so new, many developers would worry about the difficulty of obtaining approvals from the local authorities and so hesitate to be the first to adopt the honeycomb concept. Another problem is that the houses are not rectangular and the house design ends up with odd corners in the house.
Another  criticism comes from followers ‘fengshui’, the ancient Chinese art of geomancy, who believe that in a cul-de-sac ‘the chi energy coming to a house placed at the end of a road is usually fast, so the energy is pernicious and non-beneficial. Instead of bringing good fortune, it brings misfortune’.

Nowadays cul-de-sacs are often frowned upon in planning circles, especially by supporters of the New Urbanism: they do not permit higher densities, are car-dependent, and unlike grid systems, do not lend themselves to redevelopment and change. However the Honeycomb housing concept - which allows relatively high density - does appear to overcome some of the concerns here.

References

Further reading
Mohd Peter Davis, Nor Azian Nordin, Mazlin Ghazali (2006), "Thermal comfort Honeycomb Housing", Universiti Putra Malaysia 

Planned residential developments